Natchez National Historical Park commemorates the history of Natchez, Mississippi, and is managed by the National Park Service.

The park consists of four separate sites:

Fort Rosalie is the site of a former fortification from the 18th century, built by the French. It was later renamed Fort Panmure and controlled in turn by Great Britain, Spain, and the United States.  The fort site is open to the public.

The William Johnson House was the home of William Johnson, a 19th-century free African American barber and resident of Natchez whose diary has been published.

Melrose was the estate of John T. McMurran, a lawyer, state senator, and planter who lived in Natchez from 1830 until the Civil War.

Forks of the Road marks what was the second-busiest slave trading market in the Deep South between 1832 and 1863. This unit of the park opened in an official ceremony on June 18, 2021.

Both Melrose and the William Johnson House contain furnishings related to life in antebellum Natchez and other exhibits.  The collection at Melrose's two-story Greek Revival mansion and its slave quarters include painted floor cloths, mahogany, a punkah, a set of Rococo Revival parlor furniture, a set of Gothic Revival dining room chairs, and bookcases with books dating to the 18th century.  These were collected from Natchez families, including the McMurran family.  The collection in the Johnson house includes furnishings from his life and family.  Archaeological objects found in the park are also on display.

Legal history

The National Historical Park was authorized on October 7, 1988.  The William Johnson House was added to it on September 28, 1990.  As with all historic areas administered by the National Park Service, the park was listed on the National Register of Historic Places.

Fort Rosalie was already included in the National Register as part of the 1972 NRHP-listed Natchez Bluffs and Under-the-Hill Historic District;  the William Johnson House, at 210 State St., is a few blocks from the Fort Rosalie site and is both separately NRHP-listed and also included in the Natchez On-Top-of-the-Hill Historic District.  Melrose is located about two miles southwest of Fort Rosalie.

References

 The National Parks: Index 2001–2003. Washington: U.S. Department of the Interior.

External links

 Official NPS website: Natchez National Historical Park

 
National Historical Parks of the United States
Houses on the National Register of Historic Places in Mississippi
Historic house museums in Mississippi
Protected areas established in 1988
Museums in Natchez, Mississippi
African-American museums in Mississippi
National Park Service areas in Mississippi
Protected areas of Adams County, Mississippi
1988 establishments in Mississippi
Houses in Adams County, Mississippi
National Register of Historic Places in Natchez, Mississippi
Parks on the National Register of Historic Places in Mississippi
Slave cabins and quarters in the United States